Joseph Horace Shull (August 17, 1848August 9, 1944) was an American lawyer, physician and politician from Pennsylvania who served as a Democratic member of the U.S. House of Representatives for Pennsylvania's 26th congressional district from 1903 to 1905.  He also served as a member of the Pennsylvania Senate for the 22nd district from 1886 to 1891.

Early life and education
Shull was born at Martins Creek, Pennsylvania to Elias and Margaret Eakin Shull.  He attended the public schools and Blair Academy in Blairstown, New Jersey.  He took a special course at Lafayette College in Easton, Pennsylvania.  He graduated from the University of New York and in 1873 from the Bellevue Hospital Medical College, both in New York City.  He taught in the public schools of Pennsylvania for four years.  He studied law, was admitted to the bar in 1879 and commenced practice in Stroudsburg, Pennsylvania.

Career
He was the first president of the Monroe County bar association and worked as editor of the Monroe Democrat from 1881 to 1886.  He was a member of the Pennsylvania State Senate for the 22nd district from 1886 to 1891.

Shull was elected as a Democrat to the Fifty-eighth Congress.  He was an unsuccessful candidate for renomination in 1904.  He resumed the practice of law and medicine, and worked as president of the Delaware Valley railroad company. He served as a contract surgeon during the First World War.  He died in Stroudsburg in 1944 and was interred at Stroudsburg Cemetery.

Footnotes

References
 Retrieved on 2008-02-10
Joseph Horace Shull at The Political Graveyard

|-

1848 births
1944 deaths
19th-century American educators
19th-century American newspaper editors
19th-century American politicians
20th-century American physicians
20th-century American politicians
American military personnel of World War I
20th-century American railroad executives
Blair Academy alumni
Burials in Pennsylvania
Democratic Party members of the United States House of Representatives from Pennsylvania
Editors of Pennsylvania newspapers
Educators from Pennsylvania
New York University alumni
New York University Grossman School of Medicine alumni
Pennsylvania lawyers
Pennsylvania Railroad people
Democratic Party Pennsylvania state senators
Politicians from Northampton County, Pennsylvania
People from Stroudsburg, Pennsylvania
Physicians from Pennsylvania